Portugal is a coastal nation in western Europe, located at the western end of the Iberian Peninsula, bordering Spain (on its northern and eastern frontiers: a total of ). The Portuguese territory also includes a series of archipelagos in the Atlantic Ocean (the Azores and Madeira), which are strategic islands along the North Atlantic. The extreme south is not too far from the Strait of Gibraltar, leading to the Mediterranean Sea.

Despite these definitions, the Portugal-Spain border remains an unresolved territorial dispute between the two countries. Portugal does not recognise the border between Caia and Ribeira de Cuncos River deltas, since the beginning of the 1801 occupation of Olivenza by Spain. This territory, though under de facto Spanish occupation, remains a de jure part of Portugal, consequently no border is henceforth recognised in this area.

Physical

Portugal is located on the western coast of the Iberian Peninsula and plateau, that divides the inland Mediterranean Sea from the Atlantic Ocean. It is located on the Atlantic coast of this plateau and crossed by several rivers which have their origin in Spain. Most of these rivers flow from east to west disgorging in the Atlantic; from north to south, the primary rivers are the Minho, Douro, Mondego, Tagus and the Guadiana.

Coastline

Its strong relief is marked by deep submarine canyons and the continuation of the main rivers. The Estremadura Spur separates the Iberian Abyssal and Tagus Abyssal Plains, while the continental slope is flanked by sea-mounts and abuts against the prominent Gorringe Bank in the south. Currently, the Portuguese government claims a  depth, or to a depth of exploitation.

The Portuguese coast is extensive; in addition to approximately  along the coast of continental Portugal, the archipelagos of the Azores (667 km) and Madeira (250 km) are primarily surrounded by rough cliff coastlines. Most of these landscapes alternate between rough cliffs and fine sand beaches; the region of the Algarve is recognized for its sandy beaches popular with tourists, while at the same time its steep coastlines around Cape St. Vincent is well known for steep and forbidding cliffs. An interesting feature of the Portuguese coast is Ria Formosa with some sandy islands and a mild and pleasant climate characterized by warm but not very hot summers and generally mild winters.

Alternatively, the Ria de Aveiro coast (near Aveiro, referred to as "The Portuguese Venice"), is formed by a delta (approximately  length and a maximum  width) rich in fish and seabirds. Four main channels flow through several islands and islets at the mouth of the Vouga, Antuã, Boco, and Fontão Rivers. Since the 16th century, this formation of narrow headlands formed a lagoon, that, due to its characteristics allowed the formation and production of salt. It was also recognized by the Romans, whose forces exported its salt to Rome (then seen as a precious resource).

The Azores are also sprinkled with both alternating black sand and boulder-lined beaches, with only a rare exception, is there white sand beach (such as on the island of Santa Maria in Almagreira. The island of Porto Santo is one of the few extensive dune beaches in Portugal, located in the archipelago of Madeira.

Tidal gauges along the Portuguese coast have identified a  rise in sea levels, causing large estuaries and inland deltas in some major rivers to overflow.

This is the 3rd largest EEZ of all countries in the European Union and the 20th in the world.

Continent

The Portuguese territory came into existence during the history of Gondwana and became aligned with European landforms after the super-continent Pangea began its slow separation into several smaller plates. The Iberian plate was formed during the Cadomian Orogeny of the late Neoproterozoic (about 650-550 Ma), from the margins of the Gondwana continent. Through collisions and accretion a group of island arcs (that included the Central Iberian Plate, Ossa-Morena Plate, South Portuguese Plate) began to disintegrate from Gondwana (along with other European fragments). These plates never separated substantially from each other since this period. By the Mesozoic, the three "Portuguese plates" were a part of the Northern France Armoric Plate until the Bay of Biscay began to separate. Following the separation of the Iberian Abyssal Plain, Iberia and Europe began to drift progressively from North America, as the Mid-Atlantic fracture zone pulled the three plates away from the larger continent. Eventually, Iberia collided with southern France attaching the region into a peninsula of Europe (during the Cenozoic). Since the late Oligocene, the Iberian plate has been moving as part of the Eurasian plate, with the boundary between Eurasia and Africa situated along the Azores–Gibraltar fracture zone.

The Iberian peninsula, defined by its coastline, is due to a fragment of the Variscan tectonic fracture zone, the Iberian-Hesperian Massif, which occupies the west-central part of the plateau. This formation is crossed by the Central System, along an east-northeast to west-southwest alignment, parallel to the European Baetic Chain (an aspect of the Alpine Chain). The Central Cordillera is itself divided into two blocks, while three main river systems drain the differing geomorphological terrains: 
 the Northern Meseta (with a mean altitude of ) is drained by the Douro River (running east to west);
 the Southern Meseta (within a range of  altitude) is drained by the Tagus River (running east to west) from Spain, and the Guadiana River (running north to south), comprising the Lower Tagus and Sado Basins.

To the north the landscape is mountainous in the interior areas with plateaus, cut by four breakings lines that allow the development of more fertile agricultural areas.

The south down as far as the Algarve features mostly rolling plains with a climate somewhat warmer and drier than the cooler and rainier north. Other major rivers include the Douro, the Minho and the Guadiana, similar to the Tagus in that all originate in Spain. Another important river, the Mondego, originates in the Serra da Estrela (the highest mountains in mainland Portugal at 1,993 m). A full list of rivers is available in List of rivers of Portugal.

However, there are several small freshwater lakes in Portugal, the most notable of which are located in Serra da Estrela, Lake Comprida (Lagoa Comprida) and Lake Escura (Lagoa Escura), which were formed from ancient glaciers. Pateira de Fermentelos is a small natural lake near Aveiro, it is one of the largest natural lakes in the Iberian Peninsula and is rich in wildlife. In the Azores archipelago lakes were formed in the caldera of extinct volcanoes. Lagoa do Fogo and Lagoa das Sete Cidades (two small lakes connected by a narrow way) are the most famous lakes in São Miguel Island.

Lagoons in the shores of the Atlantic exist. For instance, the Albufeira Lagoon and Óbidos Lagoon (near Foz do Arelho, Óbidos).

Archipelagos

In addition to continental Europe, Portugal consists of two Autonomous Regions in the Atlantic Ocean, consisting of the archipelagos of Madeira and Azores. Madeira is located on the African Tectonic Plate, and comprises the main island of Madeira, Porto Santo and the smaller Savage Islands. The Azores, which are located between the junction of the African, European and North American Plates, straddle the Mid-Atlantic Ridge. There are nine islands in this archipelago, usually divided into three groups (Western, Central and Eastern) and several smaller Formigas (rock outcroppings) located between São Miguel and Santa Maria Islands. Both island groups are volcanic in nature, with historic volcanology and seismic activity persisting to the present time. In addition, there are several submarine volcanos in the Azores (such as Dom João de Castro Bank), that have erupted historically (such as the Serrata eruption off the coast of Terceira Island). The last major volcanic event occurred in 1957-58 along the western coast of Faial Island, which formed the Capelinhos Volcano. Seismic events are common in the Azores.
The Azores are occasionally subject to very strong earthquakes, as is the continental coast. Wildfires occur mostly in the summer in mainland Portugal and extreme weather in the form of strong winds and floods also occurs mainly in winter. The Azores are occasionally stricken by tropical cyclones such as Hurricane Jeanne (1998) and Hurricane Gordon (2006).

Climate 

Most of Portugal has a warm Mediterranean climate according to the Köppen climate classification: "Csa" in most of the lands south of the Tagus River, inland Douro Valley in the Norte Region, eastern Azores and the Madeira archipelago. The "Csb" pattern can be found north of that same river and in Costa Vicentina in coastal Southern Portugal. Most of the Azores have a humid subtropical climate or "Cfa", while a small region in inland Alentejo has Bsk or semi-arid climate. The Savage Islands are the only region to have an arid climate.

The Madeira and Azores archipelagos have a narrower temperature range. Extreme temperatures occur in the mountains in the interior North and Centre of the country in winter, where they may fall below  or in rare occasions below , particularly in the higher peaks of Serra da Estrela, and in southeastern parts in the summer, sometimes exceeding . Such temperatures are not validated since these were measured in enclosures that were much more susceptible to solar radiation and/or in enclosed gardens which tend to heat up a lot more than in the open where temperatures should be measured. Such values are however perpetuated by weather enthusiasts who are fond of extremes. Portugal as a whole is amongst the sunniest areas in Europe, with around 2300–3200 hours of sunshine a year, an average of 4-6h in winter and 10-12h in the summer.

Seasons in Portugal

Weather phenomena recorded in previous years in Portugal 

*Tornados - counted for last 5 years

Whole year UV Index table for Portugal

Environment

Environment - current issues:
soil erosion; air pollution caused by industrial and vehicle emissions; water pollution, especially in coastal areas

Environment - international agreements:
party to:
Air Pollution, Biodiversity, Climate Change, Desertification, Endangered Species, Hazardous Wastes, Law of the Sea, Marine Dumping, Marine Life Conservation, Ozone Layer Protection, Ship Pollution, Tropical Timber 83, Tropical Timber 94, Wetlands
signed, but not ratified:
Air Pollution-Persistent Organic Pollutants, Air Pollution-Volatile Organic Compounds, Climate Change-Kyoto Protocol, Environmental Modification, Nuclear Test Ban

Terrain:
Mountainous and hilly north of the Tagus River, rolling plains in south

Elevation extremes:
lowest point:
Atlantic Ocean 0 m
highest point:
Ponta do Pico (Pico or Pico Alto) on Ilha do Pico in the Azores 2,351 m

Natural resources:
fish, forests (cork), tungsten, iron ore, uranium ore, marble, arable land, hydroelectric power

Land use:
arable land:
26%
permanent crops:
9%
permanent pastures:
9%
forests and woodland:
36%
other:
20% (1993 est.)

Irrigated land:
6,300 km2 (1993 est.)

See also 
 Cabo da Roca
 Forests of the Iberian Peninsula

References

Sources
 
 
 
 

 
 
 
  in

External links
 Visible Earth. NASA-Goddard Space Flight Center. . A collection of satellite images of Portugal and the surrounding region.